American Speedway is a top-view racing arcade game released by Enerdyne Technologies in 1987.

Gameplay
It features small cars that race around tracks with bends, with time-limits and power-ups.

External links

American Speedway at Arcade History

1987 video games
Arcade video games
Top-down racing video games
Video games developed in the United States